Léon Lévy Brunswick (20 April 1805, in Paris – 29 July 1859, in Le Havre) was a French playwright. He started as a journalist before turning to theater. He is the author of many comedies with Jean-François Bayard, Louis-Émile Vanderburch, and Arthur de Beauplan such as Boccaccio, or the Prince of Palmero by Franz von Suppé.  But it is with Adolphe de Leuven that he is known for his greatest successes, notably booklets of comic operas by Adolphe Adam (Le Brasseur de Preston, Le Postillon de Lonjumeau, Le Roi d'Yvetot). He has also published under the pseudonym of Leo Lhérie.

Selected works 
 With Adolphe de Leuven: Le mariage au tambour. Comédie en trois actes, mêlée de chant. (Théâtre français en prose. Series 4, 8.) Velhagen & Klasing, Bielefeld 1855, .
 With Adolphe de Leuven, Adolphe Adam, Carl Friedrich Wittmann: Der Postillon von Lonjumeau. Komische Oper in drei Aufzügen. (Reclams Universal-Bibliothek, 2749.; Opernbücher in Reclams Universal-Bibliothek, 12.; Reclams Universal-Bibliothek/Opernbücher, 12.) Reclam, Leipzig um 1920, .

References

External links
 

French opera librettists
19th-century French journalists
French male journalists
French male dramatists and playwrights
19th-century French dramatists and playwrights
19th-century French male writers
Writers from Paris
1805 births
1859 deaths
Burials at Père Lachaise Cemetery